David Chigoev (born 28 September 1994) is a Georgian professional footballer who plays for Spaeri.

Career
In 2015, he played for Slavia Mozyr in Belarus. In 2018 he played for FC Varketili in Georgian Liga 3.

References

External links
 
 Profile at pressball.by
 

1994 births
Living people
Footballers from Georgia (country)
Expatriate footballers from Georgia (country)
Expatriate footballers in Belarus
FC Slavia Mozyr players
Association football midfielders